Chrysochraon is a genus of grasshoppers in the tribe Chrysochraontini within the subfamily Gomphocerinae. They are found mostly in mainland Europe (not the British Isles or Scandinavia) from the Pyrenees to Russia.

Species
Species include:
Chrysochraon amurensis Mishchenko, 1986
Chrysochraon beybienkoi Galvagni, 1968
Chrysochraon dispar (Germar, 1834) - type species (as Podisma dispar Germar)

References

Gomphocerinae
Orthoptera of Europe
Acrididae genera